Lake Tekakwitha is a village in Jefferson County, Missouri, United States. The population was 254 in 2010.

Geography
Lake Tekakwitha is located at 38.442423, -90.717745.

Demographics

As of the census of 2010, there were 254 people, 115 households, and 60 families residing in the village. The racial makeup of the village was 97.2% White, 0.0% Native American, 1.2% Asian, and 1.6% from two or more races. Hispanic or Latino of any race were 0.4% of the population.

References

Villages in Jefferson County, Missouri
Villages in Missouri
Populated places established in 2009
2009 establishments in Missouri